Westlake may refer to:

Places

Australia
 Westlake, Canberra, a ghost town suburb of Canberra
 Westlake, Queensland, a suburb of Brisbane

New Zealand
Westlake, New Zealand, a suburb of Auckland
Westlake Girls High School
Westlake Boys High School

United States
Westlake, Daly City, California
Westlake, Los Angeles, California
Westlake, California, a master-planned community which now comprises:
The entirety of Westlake Village, California
A neighborhood in Thousand Oaks, California
Westlake, Florida
Westlake, Georgia
Westlake, Louisiana
Westlake, Ohio
Westlake, Oregon
Westlake, Texas 
Westlake, Seattle, Washington
Westlake Center, Seattle, Washington
Westlake Corner, Virginia
Westlake High School (disambiguation)
West Lake Hills, Texas

People
Clive Westlake (1932–2000), British songwriter
David Westlake, British singer/songwriter
Dean Westlake (1960-2022), American politician
Donald E. Westlake (1933–2008), American author
H.D. Westlake (1906–1992), British classical scholar; see Hellenica Oxyrhynchia
John Westlake (law scholar) (1828–1913), English writer on international law
Martin Westlake, British and Belgian author, musician, and EU civil servant
Nathaniel Westlake (1833–1921), British artist specialising in stained glass
Nigel Westlake (born 1958), Australian composer
Philip Westlake, British painter and brother of Nathaniel

Train stations
Westlake (Link station), a light rail and bus station in Seattle
Westlake / MacArthur Park (LACMTA station), a Red Line and Purple Line subway station in Los Angeles
Westlake Station (disambiguation), stations of the name

Other
 Westlake (album), a 1987 album by David Westlake
Westlake Chemical
Westlake Entertainment, a DVD distributor; see 
Westlake Recording Studios, in West Hollywood, California
 Westlake Tyres, a brand of automotive tyres owned by Hangzhou Zhongce Rubber Company

See also
West Lake (disambiguation)